Catherine of Lorraine (3 November 1573 – 7 March 1648) was the Abbess of Remiremont.

Biography

Catherine was the seventh child and fourth daughter of Charles III, Duke of Lorraine, and his wife Claude, daughter of Henry II of France and Catherine de' Medici. Her mother died in childbirth in 1575 when Catherine was a year and a half. She was born at the Ducal Palace of Lorraine in Nancy, capital of the Duchy of Lorraine.

Catherine was devoted to religion and even went as far to ignore an alliance with the future Holy Roman Emperor, Ferdinand II.

In 1602 Catherine became the Coadjutrice of the Abbey. In 1612 she became the Abbess of the prestigious Remiremont Abbey, a Benedictine abbey near Remiremont, Vosges, France. The previous abbess, Elizabeth of Salm, had resigned specifically for Catherine to take the post

Remiremont was one of the most important, illustrious and aristocratic Abbey in France and was closely associated with the House of Lorraine. She later became the coadjutor to her niece, Margaret. Margaret had lost her mother in 1627 and went to live with Catherine at Remiremont. The young Marguerite was later the Duchess of Orléans as wife Gaston, scandalous brother of Louis XIII. Margaret, as a result of marrying Gaston without royal permission, was sent into exile with her husband in Brussels.

In 1638 the troops of Turenne occupied Remiremont for a month. The following year the Princess obtained the neutrality of Vosges (for Epinal, Remiremont, Bruyère, St Dié, Arches) for the rest of the Thirty Years War.

She died in a Lorraine which had been ravaged by the Thirty Years war. At her death, the abbey was given to her great niece Élisabeth Marguerite d'Orléans who ruled the abbey under a regency of her parents, the Duke and Duchess of Orléans.

Remiremont was ruled by two more Lorraine princesses; Élisabeth Charlotte (1700–1711) and then Anne Charlotte (1714–1773).

Ancestry

References and notes

Jacqueline Carolus-Currien, Pauvres duchesses, Metz, 2007.

1573 births
1643 deaths
16th-century French women
17th-century French women
French Roman Catholic abbesses
Abbesses of Remiremont
People from Nancy, France
Princesses of Lorraine